Tunnel Records is a record label founded by DJ Dean, and based in Hamburg, Germany. Tunnel Records was home to artists and groups such as X-Dream, DJ Dean, Gollum + Hunter, DJ Yanny, Accuface, Wrong Plane, DJ Shane, DJ Shoko, Waveliner, DJ Krid-Kid, Dj C-Bass & DJ Merlin, Ziggy X, Patrick Bunton, and Gary D.

Since 1997, Tunnel has produced Tunnel Trance Force compilation CDs based on the current "sound of the Tunnel", which refers to music played in the club 'Tunnel', also owned by Tunnel Records and located in Hamburg. Tunnel Records also publishes a number of other trance compilations such as Time Tunnel, Tunnel goes Ibiza, DJ Networx, and Best of Tunnel.

Tunnel Records has two sublabels: Push Up Records and Red Light. Under the latter were released six editions of Tunnel Red Light, techno mixes on CD, from 1996 to 1999.

Release history
Tunnel Trance Force release history:

See also
 List of record labels

References

External links
 Tunnel Records 
 Tunnel Club page on Wikipedia.de
 Discography on Discog.com
 Release history on Discog.com

German record labels
Trance record labels
IFPI members
Record labels established in 1997
German companies established in 1997
Companies based in Hamburg